Basler Lake is a large lake in the Northwest Territories, Canada.

Lakes of the Northwest Territories